Union pour la République can refer to:

 Union for the Republic (Burkina Faso)
 Union for the Republic (Congo)
 Union for the Republic (Togo)
 Union for the Republic (Mauritania)